Leposava Marković (born 20 May 1973) is a Serbian judoka. She competed in the women's extra-lightweight event at the 1992 Summer Olympics.

References

External links
 

1973 births
Living people
Serbian female judoka
Olympic judoka as Independent Olympic Participants
Judoka at the 1992 Summer Olympics
Sportspeople from Pančevo
Mediterranean Games silver medalists for Yugoslavia
Mediterranean Games medalists in judo
Competitors at the 1997 Mediterranean Games
20th-century Serbian women